Fina or FINA may refer to:

 FINA (Fédération Internationale de Natation), the original name of World Aquatics, the international governing body for aquatic sports
 Fina (architecture), a narrow public space immediately alongside buildings
 Fina, a main character in the Skies of Arcadia video game
 Fina, a nickname for Trenbolone, an anabolic steroid
 FINA, the North American Forum on Integration (Le Forum sur l'Intégration Nord-Américaine)
 Petrofina, a Belgian petroleum company (known as FINA in the United States and the United Kingdom)
 Saint Fina, a 13th-century saint

See also
 Fin (disambiguation)
 Final (disambiguation)
 Finna (disambiguation)
 FINAA, Finnish Aviation Academy